is a Japanese film director, writer, and producer.

Biography
Most famous for his entries in the Heisei Godzilla series, Takao Okawara joined Tōhō in 1973, but would not get his first shot in the director's chair until 1980, when he joined Akira Kurosawa and Ishirō Honda on the film Kagemusha (1980). Four years later, he worked as an assistant director for the first Godzilla film of the Heisei series: The Return of Godzilla (1984). Okawara debuted as primary director seven years later on the film Reiko, the Psyche Resurrected (1991), which he also wrote. His most notable credit is perhaps the crafting the most profitable Godzilla film, Godzilla vs. Mothra, in 1992. The director stated that his work on the first film in the Millennium series, Godzilla 2000: Millennium (1999), would be his last for the series. It would also mark the end of his career at Tōhō.

Filmography

References

External links
 

1949 births
Living people
Japanese male actors
People from Tokyo